Funk Filharmonik is a long-running a funk and soul outfit from Astoria, New York which has been together since the mid-1980s. The group contains former Tower of Power members. Individually and collectively the group has performed and recorded with major artists.

History
The group was formed in Huntington in 1985. The original name for the group was Funk Philharmonia. Their first show was on November 21, 1985. They are one of the longest-running groups from Long Island. In the late 1990s, there were two former Tower of Power members in its lineup.  Two of the founding members were drummer Steve Finkelstein and trombonist and singer, Ozzie Melendez. Melendez has recorded with Celine Dion, Billy Joel, Jennifer Lopez and Lita Ford. Finklestein had worked with Ben E. King, Donna Summer and the Tower of Power. Members of the group have worked with and recorded with artists such as Tito Puente, Willie Colon, Freddie Hubbard, Jonathan Butler, Marc Anthony, Lionel Hampton, and the Brecker Brothers.

In 2008, they released their album Everybody Get Down. Guest musicians on the album included Barry Danielian, Carl Fischer, Jillian Armsbury, Tim Lawless and Ted Kumpel.

In April 2015, the group was appearing with Troy Ramey at K.J. Farrells in Nassau County. In late November 2015, the group was appearing at The Rockville Centre in New York.

Members
 Tom Bowes – Lead Vocals
 Ozzie Melendez – Musical Director, Trombone & Vocals
 Lee Finkelstein – Drums, Band Leader
 Brent Carter – Lead Vocals
 Ron Fox – Trumpet
 Vinnie Cinquemani – Trumpet
 John Scarpulla – Tenor Sax
 Dave Lavender – Guitar
 Chris Karlic – Baritone Sax
 Jack Knight – Bass
 Greg Schleich – Keyboards
 Steve Finkelstein – Percussion

References

American soul musical groups
American funk musical groups
Musical groups established in 1985
1985 establishments in New York (state)